Kading is a surname. Notable people with this surname include:

Charles A. Kading (1874–1956), U.S. Representative from Wisconsin
Greg Kading (born 1963), American author and former Los Angeles Police Department detective
Jack Kading (1884–1964), first baseman in Major League Baseball
Tom Kading (born ), American politician, business owner, and lawyer
Walter Kading, German recipient of the Knight's Cross of the Iron Cross

See also
Kading or Kedenj, a village in Fars Province, Iran
Kadin (disambiguation)
Kadington
Kanding